

Isobel Noeline Waller-Bridge (born 23 April 1984) is a British composer who is known for her scores for film, television, and theatre, along with her works for electronic music and contemporary classical music.

Life and career
Waller-Bridge received her bachelor's degree in music from Edinburgh University and a master's degree from King's College London. She was also awarded a scholarship from the Royal Academy of Music, where she received another diploma.

Waller-Bridge composed the soundtrack for the BBC comedy-drama series, Fleabag (2016–2019), which was written by and starring her sister, Phoebe Waller-Bridge. She also wrote the score for the feature film, Vita and Virginia (2018), and Emma. (2020). In 2021, she scored Netflix's Munich: The Edge of War, which was released by Milan Records/Sony Music, and The Phantom of the Open.

Aside from composing, Waller-Bridge is also a performer, playing in venues such as the St James Theatre and Union Chapel. In 2016, her music appeared on albums with the Icelandic composers Ólafur Arnalds and Jóhann Jóhannsson. In 2021, she was commissioned by the Philharmonia Orchestra to write music for their Human/Nature series. Her piece, Temperatures, was premiered in November 2021, conducted by Pekka Kuusisto at the Royal Festival Hall. In 2020, she was commissioned by Sarah Burton to score Alexander McQueen’s Spring/Summer 2020 collection at Paris Fashion Week. In 2021, she collaborated with ballet dancer and actress, Francesca Hayward, to score her dance film, Siren.

For theatre, Waller-Bridge worked on Florian Zeller's The Son (West End) and The Forest (Hampstead Theatre), Woyzeck, adapted by Jack Thorne (Old Vic), Blood Wedding (Young Vic), and Knives in Hens (Donmar Warehouse).

In June 2022, it was announced that Waller-Bridge would be providing an original score for an animated short film of The Boy, The Mole, The Fox And The Horse, which aired on BBC One and BBC iPlayer on Christmas 2022.

Personal life
Waller-Bridge is the daughter of Theresa Mary Waller-Bridge (née Clerke) and Michael Cyprian Waller-Bridge. Her father founded the electronic trading platform, Tradepoint, and her mother works for the Worshipful Company of Ironmongers.

The Waller-Bridge family were landed gentry of Cuckfield, Sussex. On her father's side, she is a descendant of the Revd Sir Egerton Leigh, 2nd Baronet, and a distant relative of politician and author, Egerton Leigh. Her maternal grandfather was Sir John Edward Longueville Clerke, 12th baronet, of Hitcham, Buckinghamshire.

Waller-Bridge has two younger siblings: Jasper Waller-Bridge and Phoebe Waller-Bridge.

Works
 Music for Strings (2013)

Television
 Life (2002 documentary series, four episodes)
 War & Peace (2016 TV series)
 Fleabag (2016-2019)
 Vanity Fair (2018 TV series)
 The Split (2018 TV series)
 The ABC Murders (2018 TV series) 
 Black Mirror (2019, episode "Rachel, Jack and Ashley Too")
 The Way Down (2021)
 Roar (2022)

Film
 Vita and Virginia (2018)
 Emma (2020)
 Munich – The Edge of War (2021)
 The Phantom of the Open (2021)
 I Came By (2022)
 The Boy, the Mole, the Fox and the Horse (2022; short film)

References

External links
 
 
 
 
 Isobel Waller-Bridge on Spotify

1984 births 
Living people
Alumni of the University of Edinburgh
Alumni of King's College London
Alumni of the Royal Academy of Music
English television composers
English film score composers
British women composers
Women television composers
Women film score composers
Mercury KX artists
Musicians from London
21st-century British composers
21st-century English women musicians
English women in electronic music
21st-century women composers
Isobel